Saluria ochridorsella is a moth of the family Pyralidae first described by Émile Louis Ragonot in 1888. It is found in India and Sri Lanka.

References

Moths of Asia
Moths described in 1888
Phycitini